Café Lunchrasten is a 1954 Swedish drama film directed by Hampe Faustman and starring Lars Ekborg, Doris Svedlund and Annalisa Ericson. It was shot at the Centrumateljéerna Studios in Stockholm. The plot revolves around a cafe in the old Klara district of Sweden's capital city, and the varied clientele who gather there.

Cast
 Lars Ekborg as Harald
 Doris Svedlund as Bojan, waitress
 Annalisa Ericson as 	Buttercup
 Nils Hallberg as 	Bernt
 Stig Järrel as 	Ali Baba
 Emy Hagman as 	Mia
 Douglas Håge as Albert Karlsson
 Eivor Landström as 	Cecilia, waitress
 Inger Juel as 	Steffy
 Solveig Hedengran as 	Ali Baba's Wife
 Per-Axel Arosenius as 	Police officer 
 Helga Brofeldt as 	Sophia 
 Ernst Eklund as 	Editor-in-chief 
 Olle Hilding as 	Editor 
 Gösta Holmström as Police officer 
 Svea Holst as Woman with bucket 
 Stig Johanson as 	Postman 
 Birger Lensander as 	Clerk 
 Arne Ragneborn as 	Bernt's friend 
 Hanny Schedin as 	News paper dispenser
 Tage Severin as 	Bernt's friend 
 Per Sjöstrand as 	Arty student 
 Alexander von Baumgarten as Nicke 
 Ivar Wahlgren as 	Youth prison director 
 Catrin Westerlund as 	Hairdresser

References

Bibliography 
 Qvist, Per Olov & von Bagh, Peter. Guide to the Cinema of Sweden and Finland. Greenwood Publishing Group, 2000.

External links 
 

1954 films
Swedish drama films
1954 drama films
1950s Swedish-language films
Films directed by Hampe Faustman
Swedish black-and-white films
Films set in Stockholm
1950s Swedish films